WTNX-LD (channel 15) is a low-power television station in Nashville, Tennessee, United States, affiliated with the Spanish-language Telemundo network. Owned by Gray Television, it also functions as a repeater for its full-power sister station, NBC affiliate WSMV-TV (channel 4). The two stations share studios on Knob Road in West Nashville; WTNX-LD's transmitter is located on Oldham Street near downtown.

History

First incarnation of Telemundo Nashville (2006–2010)
From 2006 to 2010, Telemundo was broadcast as a second digital subchannel of WSMV-TV, making it the first full-power Spanish-language TV service in the city. However, after five years on the air, the subchannel went defunct on December 31, 2010, leaving Nashville at the time with only one Spanish-language television station, WLLC-LP (channel 42), the area's Telefutura (now UniMás) outlet; WLLC had been the first Spanish-language TV station in the city upon affiliating in 2004.

Origins and as a translator station
Landover 2, LLC, applied for and was granted a construction permit to build a new low-power TV station on channel 41, W41EI-D, at Algood (a suburb of Cookeville). As a result of the repack, the permit sat for several years. The station would be purchased by Lowcountry 34 Media, LLC (owned by Jeffrey Winemiller) on July 30, 2021; Winemiller relocated the facility to channel 15 at Nashville, with the new call sign W15ER-D, and completed construction of the station, airing two subchannels of religious programs.

Winemiller initially filed to sell W15ER-D to Marquee Broadcasting in August 2021, but he instead opted to sell another low-power station, W09DM-D (now WNSH-LD), to the group. Winemiller then filed to sell the channel 15 station to Gray Television, which was in the process of merging with the Meredith Corporation, owner of WSMV-TV. The $3.75 million transaction between Lowcountry 34 and Gray included 24 different low-power facilities, including two in Tennessee. On December 30, 2021, W15ER-D converted from airing religious programming to a rebroadcast translator of the WSMV-TV multiplex. As WSMV-TV is broadcast on the VHF band, the additional UHF facility improves reception with smaller indoor antennas—which more easily receive UHF—in the Nashville metro area.

Telemundo conversion
Gray announced on May 3, 2022, that it had reached an agreement with Telemundo to start Telemundo channels, primarily as adjuncts to Gray stations, in 22 additional Southern markets and renew existing affiliations in 12 others. The new service launched August 29, 2022, with the renamed WTNX-LD also carrying the main WSMV 4.1 subchannel as 4.10.

Programming
WTNX clears the entire Telemundo programming schedule, except for the 5 p.m. CT timeslot on weekdays, when the station airs a locally-oriented newscast, Telemundo Noticias Tennessee, produced at Gray Television headquarters in Atlanta. The station's newscast aired its debut edition on November 28, 2022.

Subchannels
The station's digital signal is multiplexed:

References

Telemundo network affiliates
TNX-LD
Spanish-language television stations in Tennessee
Low-power television stations in the United States
Gray Television
Television channels and stations established in 2021
2021 establishments in Tennessee